A malthouse is a building used for the production of malt from cereal grain.

Malthouse may also refer to:
 Christi Malthouse (born 1976), Australian television personality
 Kit Malthouse (born 1966), English politician and businessman
 Mick Malthouse (born 1953), Australian rules football player and coach
 Samuel Malthouse (1857–1931), English cricketer
 William Malthouse (1890–1961), English cricketer

See also
 Malthouse Broad
 Malthouse Theatre, Melbourne
 
 Malta House, the High Commission of Malta in the United Kingdom
 Malthous or Halphas, a demon